Sloan is a village in Erie County, New York, United States. The population was 3,661 at the 2010 census. It is part of the Buffalo–Niagara Falls Metropolitan Statistical Area and is in the town of Cheektowaga.

History 
The village was incorporated in 1896 from part of Cheektowaga. With the CSX Frontier yard to the village's north and the Norfolk Southern Bison yard to the village's south, it was a historically important railroad town like nearby Depew. (These yards were originally the New York Central and Erie-Lackawanna, respectively.)

For much of its history the village had a police force ranging from three to six officers. The force was abolished circa 1978, and the four patrolmen and one captain were absorbed by the Cheektowaga Police Department, which to this day provides police services to the village.

Visniak brand soft drinks were made in Sloan.

Notable people
Jerry Augustyniak, drummer for 10,000 Maniacs
Edmund P. Radwan, former US congressman

Geography
Sam Sloan owned the land which extended to the New York State Thruway when it was founded, but it is only  today. Sloan is located at  (42.894458, -78.791353).

The village is bounded on the north by New York State Route 130 (Broadway) and on the east by New York State Route 240 (Harlem Road).

Demographics

At the 2000 census there were 3,775 people, 1,680 households, and 1,033 families living in the village. The population density was 4,755.6 people per square mile (1,845.0/km). There were 1,789 housing units at an average density of 2,253.7 per square mile (874.4/km).  The racial makeup of the village was 99.05% White, 0.21% African American, 0.13% Native American, 0.13% Asian, 0.16% from other races, and 0.32% from two or more races. Hispanic or Latino of any race were 0.72%.

Of the 1,680 households 24.0% had children under the age of 18 living with them, 44.5% were married couples living together, 12.5% had a female householder with no husband present, and 38.5% were non-families. 33.3% of households were one person and 18.9% were one person aged 65 or older. The average household size was 2.25 and the average family size was 2.89.

The age distribution was 20.1% under the age of 18, 6.5% from 18 to 24, 28.8% from 25 to 44, 20.4% from 45 to 64, and 24.2% 65 or older. The median age was 42 years. For every 100 females, there were 89.3 males. For every 100 females age 18 and over, there were 86.2 males.

The median household income was $29,420 and the median family income  was $39,863. Males had a median income of $31,679 versus $23,438 for females. The per capita income for the village was $15,964. About 10.1% of families and 11.5% of the population were below the poverty line, including 19.1% of those under age 18 and 3.9% of those age 65 or over.

References

External links
Village of Sloan official website

Villages in New York (state)
Buffalo–Niagara Falls metropolitan area
Villages in Erie County, New York